The Mississippi Army National Guard is the Army National Guard component of the Mississippi National Guard. It was originally formed in 1798. It is a component of the United States Army and the United States National Guard. It is managed by the Mississippi Military Department.

The Mississippi Army National Guard maintains 97 armories in 93 communities. Mississippi Army National Guard units are trained and equipped as part of the United States Army. The same ranks and insignia are used and National Guardsmen are eligible to receive all United States military awards. The Mississippi Guard also bestows a number of state awards for local services rendered in or to the state of Mississippi.

History
The Mississippi Army National Guard came into existence under Winthrop Sargent, the first Governor of the Mississippi Territory, with the issuance of an order on 8 September 1798 organizing the Militia of the Territory. On 28 February 1799, Governor Sargent was able to get his legislative body together and the first law was passed for the permanent establishment of the Militia in Mississippi. This law constituted the beginning of the lineage of the 155th Infantry Regiment in Mississippi.

The 155th Infantry Regiment is one of only nineteen Army National Guard units with campaign credit for the War of 1812, and the only one from west of the Appalachians.

Through the years the laws governing the Militia changed in various ways. Establishment of units varied from year to year, and ways of obtaining strength for the units also varied. There were periods of lack and little Militia at all. At other times the Militia forces were well organized.

Although the Mississippi Militia participated in every war and fight of any consequence from the Sabine Expedition of 1806 through the Korean War in 1953, it was not until 1916 the Mississippi National Guard was called for active duty. In 1916 the War Department called three infantry battalions for service on the Mexican Border. These battalions formed the First Infantry Regiment which went on active duty on 24 June 1916. In September 1917 this unit was redesignated the 155th Infantry Regiment and served in the 39th Division in France. Also created during World War I, largely from Arkansas Army National Guard units, was the 154th Infantry Regiment, which continued its service after the war with the Mississippi Army National Guard.

Again in 1940 all units of the Mississippi National Guard were inducted into Federal service. Between 1950 and 1951, 77 of 81 units were called into service during the Korean War. A total of 6,515 Mississippi Guardsmen served during this period. Around the early 1960s, the Mississippi Army National Guard had 151 units located throughout the State. 51 of these units were part of the 31st (Dixie) Division and the remainder were non-divisional units.

Among units formed within the MS ARNG since World War II are the 108th Armored Cavalry Regiment, the 198th Armor Regiment, the
114th Field Artillery Regiment, the 185th Aviation Regiment, and the 204th Air Defense Artillery Regiment.

For much of the final decades of the twentieth century, National Guard personnel typically served "One weekend a month, two weeks a year", with a portion working for the Guard in a full-time capacity. The current forces formation plans of the US Army call for the typical National Guard unit (or National Guardsman) to serve one year of active duty for every three years of service. More specifically, current Department of Defense policy is that no Guardsman will be involuntarily activated for a total of more than 24 months (cumulative) in one six-year enlistment period (this policy is due to change 1 August 2007, the new policy states that soldiers will be given 24 months between deployments of no more than 24 months, individual states have differing policies).

The 1st Battalion, 198th Armor Regiment (HQ Senatobia) used to serve as part of the 155th Armoured Brigade, but was disbanded as part of the c.2010 modular ('Army Transformation') reorganization.

Structure
In 2016, the Mississippi Army National Guard included the following units:
 Joint Forces Headquarters
154th Regiment (Regional Training Institute)
1st Battalion (Armor)
2nd Battalion (Infantry)
3rd Battalion (Non Commissioned Officers Academy)
4th Battalion (Medical)
 972nd JAG Detachment
 Detachment 16, Operational Support Airlift Command (OSA)
 155th Armored Brigade Combat Team (HQ Tupelo)
 1st Squadron, 98th Cavalry Regiment (HQ Amory)
 1st Battalion, 155th Infantry Regiment (HQ McComb)
 2nd Battalion, 198th Armor Regiment (HQ Senatobia)
 2nd Battalion, 114th Field Artillery Regiment (HQ Starkville)
 106th Brigade Support Battalion (HQ Hattiesburg)
 150th Brigade Engineer Battalion (HQ Meridian)
 184th Sustainment Command (HQ Laurel)
 168th Engineer Brigade
 223rd Engineer Battalion
 890th Engineer Battalion
 298th Support Battalion
 367th Maintenance Company
 3656th Maintenance Company
 1387th Quartermaster Company (Water)
 1687th Transportation Company (Medium Truck)
 31st Support Detachment (Rear Operations Center)
 114th Support Detachment (Army Liaison Team)
 66th Troop Command
 185th Aviation Brigade
 2nd Battalion, 20th Special Forces Group
 Army National Guard Special Operations Detachment South (HQ Jackson)
 47th Civil Support Team (HQ Flowood)
 102d Public Affairs Detachment
 41st Army Band
 1st Battalion, 204th Air Defense Artillery Regiment

See also
Mississippi State Guard

References

External links
 
 Bibliography of Mississippi Army National Guard History compiled by the United States Army Center of Military History
 GlobalSecurity.org Mississippi Army National Guard, accessed 25 Nov 2006

Mississippi National Guard
 Army National Guard
Army National Guard
Military units and formations established in 1798
Army National Guard
Organizations based in Mississippi
Army National Guard